Cachoeira do Sul is a municipality in the state of Rio Grande do Sul, southernmost Brazil.

Its Marian Catedral da Nossa Senhora da Conceição  is the episcopal see of the Roman Catholic Diocese of Cachoeira do Sul.

It is located at a latitude of 30º02'21" S and a longitude of 52º53'38" W, at an approximate elevation of 68 meters above sea level. Its population in 2020 was approximately 81,869 and its area is 3715.5 square kilometers.

Climate 

Sports 
There are two soccer teams in Cachoeira do Sul, Grêmio Esportivo São José and Cachoeira Futebol Clube they both play at the Joaquim Vidal Stadium.

Notable locals 
 Alexandre Garcia, journalist
 Antônio Vicente da Fontoura,  leaders of the Riograndense Republic
 Luisinho Netto, soccer player
 Nelson Aerts, tennis player
 Roberto Linck, soccer player and owner of Linck Group

References

External links 
 

Municipalities in Rio Grande do Sul